Dorogorskoye is a rural locality (a selo) and the administrative center of Dorogorskoye Rural Settlement of Mezensky District, Arkhangelsk Oblast, Russia. The population was 391 as of 2010. There are 3 streets.

Geography 
Dorogorskoye is located on the Mezen River, 31 km south of Mezen (the district's administrative centre) by road. Timoshchelye is the nearest rural locality.

References 

Rural localities in Mezensky District
Mezensky Uyezd